Tatvan Pier railway station is a railway station and pier in Tatvan, Turkey. Situated on the western shore of Lake Van, the station serves as a connection between modes of transport, with two slips carrying a total of seven tracks. TCDD Taşımacılık operates a ferry between Tatvan and Van, which  carries passengers freight railcars and vehicles across the lake. Up until July 2015, the Trans-Asia Express, from Ankara, stopped at the station. Passengers would travel to Van via ferry, where the eastern half of the train would continue to Tehran, Iran.  As of mid-2015, freight trains are the only rail traffic at the station.

References

External links
Station timetable

Railway stations in Bitlis Province
Railway stations opened in 1964
1964 establishments in Turkey
Lake Van